The Wringer (also "wringer box illusion" or "mangle box") is a stage magic trick.  The magician places his assistant (or a shill from the audience) into a large box with a set of rollers in the front.  The magician turns a crank, and the assistant emerges through the rollers, now flat as a pancake. The magician then opens the front of the box, revealing it to be empty.  The magician may later restore the assistant, though this is not required. This trick can also be performed with small animals, such as ducks or rabbits.

References
Dawes, A. E., et al.  Making Magic.  London: Multimedia Books, Ltd, 1993.

Magic tricks